Ruben Mikaeli Aharonian or Aharonyan (born 1947, Riga, Latvia) is an Armenian classical violinist. He has won second prize at  the Enescu Competition in Bucharest and the Tchaikovsky Competition in Moscow (1974, second prize). He is a professor at Yerevan State Conservatory and the first violinist of the Borodin Quartet since 1996.

Aharonyan studied at the Moscow State Conservatory with Yuri Yankelevich, and afterwards became a student of Leonid Kogan. In 1982 Aharonyan became the artistic director of National Chamber Orchestra of Armenia. He has toured throughout Europe, North, and South America.

Awards
 People's Artist of Armenia (1980)
 State Prize of Armenia (1988)
 State Prize of Russia (2001)

Books
 (in Russian) И. Л. Золотова. Рубен Агаронян. — Ереван: Советакан грох, 1989. — 148 стр.

External links 
 The Borodin Quartet official page

1947 births
Living people
Musicians from Riga
Armenian classical violinists
Soviet Armenians
Tchaikovsky Secondary Music School alumni
21st-century classical violinists